Siah Gol (also Romanized as Sīāh Gol, Sīyāh Gol, and Sīāhgel) is a village in Howmeh Rural District, in the Central District of Gilan-e Gharb County, Kermanshah Province, Iran. At the 2006 census, its population was 197, in 36 families.

References 

Populated places in Gilan-e Gharb County